Podosturmia is a genus of flies in the family Tachinidae.

References
Podosturmia dirphiae Townsend, 1928

Distribution
Brazil.

References

Exoristinae
Tachinidae genera
Diptera of South America
Monotypic Brachycera genera
Taxa named by Charles Henry Tyler Townsend